Rabot may refer to:

Geography
Rabot, Tajikistan, a city in Tajikistan
Rabot Island, island near  Antarctica
Rabot Glacier, glacier in Antarctica
Rabot Point, a high rocky point in James Ross Island, Antarctica

People with the surname
Charles Rabot, French geographer and glaciologist
Pierre Rabot, French sailor